Tair may refer to:

 Tair, Egyptian princess, daughter of Ahmose I and his secondary wife, Kasmut.

Tair is derived from "altair", the Arabic word for a bird.

 Tair Airways
 Tair Carn Uchaf
 Tair (lens), a Soviet telephoto prime lens series manufactured by Zenit.

TAIR may refer to :
 The Arabidopsis Information Resource, a database on Arabidopsis thaliana genome

Tairov may refer to :
 Alexander Tairov (1885-1950), a Russia theatre director
 Tairov, a village in the Armavir Province of Armenia

See also 
 Taer (disambiguation)
 Tahir